Forbes River, a perennial river of the Hastings River catchment, is located in the Mid North Coast region of New South Wales, Australia.

Course and features
Forbes River rises west of Spokes Mountain, on the northern slopes of Abbotsmith Ridge, Great Dividing Range, within Willi Willi National Park, and flows generally south before reaching its confluence with the Hastings River, near Yarras. The river descends  over its  course.

The river was named by Surveyor-General John Oxley in honour of Francis Forbes, who later became first Chief Justice of the NSW Supreme Court.

Areas adjacent to the Forbes River were an important source of logging timber with several sawmills operating along the river. The lower reaches were used for dairying, but these farms now rear beef cattle. Dingos, carpet pythons, and goannas inhabit parts of the Forbes River.

See also 

 Rivers of New South Wales
 List of rivers of New South Wales (A–K)
 List of rivers of Australia

References

External links
 

 

Rivers of New South Wales
Mid North Coast